Anacondas: Trail of Blood (also known as Anaconda 4) is a 2009 American horror thriller television film directed by Don E. FauntLeRoy and starring Crystal Allen, Linden Ashby, Danny Midwinter, and John Rhys-Davies. The film is a sequel to Anaconda 3: Offspring (2008) and the fourth installment in the Anaconda film series. It premiered on the Sci-Fi Channel on February 28, 2009.

It was intended as a backdoor pilot for a potential television series of the same name, but no follow-up series was ever produced.

It was followed by Lake Placid vs. Anaconda (2015), a crossover sequel with Lake Placid franchise.

Plot 
A baby anaconda, captured at the end of the previous film, is being used for experiments by Peter Reysner, who creates a hybrid of the blood orchids from Borneo that enabled the anaconda to grow very large and live longer, and creates a serum for cell regeneration. After the test seemingly works for the baby anaconda to regenerate, Peter burns it. When he disappears, the long anaconda escapes from the cage and kills Peter in a mine filled with blood orchids. Peter "J.D." Murdoch, a billionaire suffering from bone cancer, sends his assassin Eugene and his team of henchmen mercenaries to find Peter and the serum Peter created so that it can cure him. He also tells them to be careful of Dr. Amanda Hayes and kill her if needed. Dr. Amanda Hayes, the sole survivor of the previous snake attack, and two officers also go in search of Peter, determined to destroy the serum and kill the snake.

On the way, they meet Alex, a trekker who appears lost in the Romanian Carpathians, while doing a paleopathology project. When they discover the blood orchids in the mine, Amanda sets the explosives to destroy the orchids, but she and the group are attacked by the anaconda that kills one of the officers with her while the other officer hides and disappears. Amanda is able to trick the snake into causing a cave-in that "kills" the snake however as she and Alex attempt to leave the mine, she is knocked unconscious and Alex escapes to get more help. Meanwhile, a group of explorers: Jackson, girlfriend Wendy, Wendy's best friend Heather, and brothers Patrick and Scott, get dragged into the search for the snake. Due to the serum, the anaconda can no longer die without significant damage to its internal organs and regenerates itself from the previous cave-in. Heather falls ill due to a spider bite. The next day, the group Murdoch hires is attacked by the anaconda and it kills one of them. Alex and Amanda regroup after Amanda saves Alex from the snake and they both eventually find the explorers from earlier after the snake attacks and tears off Patrick's arm. Eugene and his henchmen eventually find Hayes and Jackson's group and capture them. When Amanda is uncooperative in their efforts to get information about the serum, Eugene shoots and kills Patrick. During this moment of confusion, Wendy tries to escape and Eugene shoots her dead, which enrages Jackson.

Amanda and Scott are forced to find the serum, and are accompanied by two henchmen of Eugene to find it. They put up at Peter's house. There the two find the serum but keep it hidden. The anaconda strikes the house and devours one gunman and, while the other is trying to fight it off, Amanda and Scott escape and discover more of the serum in a shed. Jackie, the other gunman, corners them, but is taken by surprise by Scott. The snake attacks Jackie and he accidentally blows himself up with a grenade while trying to destroy the snake. It then chases Amanda and Scott. Scott sacrifices himself to the snake to buy time for Amanda to run. In an attempt to destroy the snake, Amanda throws a gasoline tank at the snake and blows it up, but the snake regenerates after she flees.

Back at the base camp, Murdoch appears, but is in for a rude shock when he sees his arch-enemy, the "officer" who had originally accompanied Amanda earlier, Vasile. Murdoch orders Eugene to "clean house"; however, it turns out Vasile offered more money and gets Eugene to join forces with him instead. When Vasile orders him to kill Murdoch, Jackson takes the moment of hostility to stab Eugene whose gun accidentally goes off and kills Vasile. The last remaining mercenary Armon hears the commotion and is tackled by Jackson; however, Jackson gets wounded from a bullet and just as Armon is about to kill him, Amanda shoots him to death. Murdoch reappears after the gunfire, holding Armon's gun and demands that Amanda give him the serum. As they do that, he keeps his word and allows them to leave. As the remaining survivors leave in the jeep, Murdoch injects himself with the serum and discovers it works, but the snake rips his head off after coiling him. Amanda finally destroys the orchids for good in the mines, and the group tries to escape in a jeep as the anaconda pursues them. Eugene, who survived and has clung to the back of the vehicle, attacks them, determined to get the rest of the serum. Jackson confronts him in the back of the truck after he gets a shot at Amanda's arm. They both fight in the back of the jeep, giving Amanda enough time to kick Eugene out of the car with two grenades in hand. While the snake devours him, it is blown to bits. The anaconda, who seems to have regenerated, slithers into the forest as the group departs.

Cast

Production 
The film was shot back-to-back with Anaconda 3: Offspring in Romania (Bucharest, Danube Delta, etc.).
When the film was first announced, David Hasselhoff was slated to appear reprising his character of Stephen Hammett from the third film, but he does not appear.

Reception 
DVD Verdict rated it 58/100 and called it "hugely boring".

See also 
 List of killer snake films

References

External links 
 

2009 films
2009 horror films
2009 television films
2009 action films
2000s thriller films
American monster movies
American natural horror films
Romanian horror films
Romanian independent films
Action television films
American thriller television films
Films about mining
Films about snakes
Films set in forests
Films shot in Romania
Films shot in Bucharest
Giant monster films
Syfy original films
Sony Pictures direct-to-video films
Stage 6 Films films
Television sequel films
American horror television films
English-language Romanian films
Anaconda (film series)
Films directed by Don E. FauntLeRoy
2000s English-language films
2000s American films
Television films as pilots
Television pilots not picked up as a series
Direct-to-video sequel films